Thamarakkulam may refer to, 

 Thamarakulam, a business centre and neighbourhood of the city of Kollam, India
 Thamarakkulam, a village in Alappuzha district, Kerala, India